Kourosh Kalantar-zadeh   (born in November 1971) is an Australian scientist involved in research in the fields of materials sciences, electronics, and transducers. He is best known for his works on two-dimensional semiconductors, ingestible sensors and liquid metals. He led his group to the invention of an ingestible chemical sensor: human gas sensing capsule.

Career 
Kourosh Kalantar-zadeh is the Head of School of Chemical and Biomolecular Engineering, at the University of Sydney, Australia. He is a 2018 Australian Research Council (ARC) Laureate Fellow   and an adjunct professor of engineering at UNSW, in Sydney. Formerly, he was a Distinguished Professor of Electronic Engineering at RMIT in Melbourne. Kourosh Kalantar-zadeh was also the Director of the Centre for Advanced Solid and Liquid based Electronics and Optics (CASLEO) at UNSW.

Kalantar-zadeh has coauthored over 500 highly cited research articles and reviews. In addition, he is a member of the editorial boards or advisory boards of Applied Materials Today, ACS Sensors, Advanced Materials Technologies, Nanoscale (journal), Applied Surface Science and ACS Nano. Kalantar-zadeh is an Associate Editor for ACS Applied Nano Materials.
He was also a Chief Investigator within the ARC Centre of Excellence in Future Low-Energy Electronics Technologies (FLEET) developing nanofabrication methods and 2D/novel materials for future electronics.

Awards and recognitions
Kourosh Kalantar-zadeh has received many national and international awards for the recognition of his work on sensors and liquid metals. A selected few are listed as follows:

 2021 Fellow of the American Association for the Advancement of Science
 2021 Clarivate Highly Cited Researchers list 
 2020 Fellow of the Royal Society of New South Wales
2020 Robert Boyle Prize for Analytical Science, Royal Society of Chemistry (RSC), UK 
 2020 Clarivate Highly Cited Researchers list 
 2019 Walter Burfitt Prize from the Royal Society of New South Wales
 2019 LinkedIn Spotlight for Australia
 2019 Clarivate Highly Cited Researchers list 
 2018 American Chemical Society (ACS) Advances in Measurement Science Lectureship Award (Asia-Pacific region) 
 2018 Clarivate Highly Cited Researchers list
 2018 Australian Research Council (ARC) Laureate Fellow
 2017 IEEE Sensors Council Technical Achievement Award

References 

Australian materials scientists
Living people
1971 births
Fellows of the Royal Society of New South Wales